The Istanbul Shield was a football tournament for Istanbul clubs in Turkey which was organised between 1930 and 1939. At the beginning it was decided that the club which would win the most titles during the nine-year span would be the final owner of the shield. The final match between Galatasaray and Fenerbahçe in 1931 was not played. In 1932, Fenerbahçe, Galatasaray and Beşiktaş did not participate and İstanbulspor won the shield. In 1933 the semi-final game was cancelled due to the abusive behavior of Fenerbahçe fans when their team was leading 2–0. Galatasaray won the repeated game by 1–0. The tournament was later re-organized under the name Istanbul Football Cup (İstanbul Kupası in Turkish).

Since Fenerbahçe won the title a record four times, they became the final owners of the shield, which is exhibited in the museum of the club until today.

Winners

References

External links
Turkish Football Databank

Defunct football cup competitions in Turkey
1930 establishments in Turkey
1939 disestablishments in Turkey
Sport in Istanbul
Recurring sporting events established in 1930
Recurring events disestablished in 1939